Ruth Padilla DeBorst is a Latin American evangelical theologian affiliated with the Latin American Theological Fellowship and based in Costa Rica.

Biography 
Padilla DeBorst was born in Colombia as the eldest daughter of an American mother, Catharine Feser Padilla, and an Ecuadorian father, the theologian René Padilla. She attended high school and university in Argentina, receiving her B.Ed. at the Instituto Nacional Superior en Lenguas Vivas in 1984, an M.A. in Interdisciplinary Studies at Wheaton College in 1987, and a PhD in theology from Boston University in 2016, under the supervision of Dana L. Robert. She is known for being an advocate of integral mission, an evangelical form of liberation theology.

She is a former president of the Latin American Theological Fellowship (known in Spanish as Fraternidad Teológica Latinoamericana or FTL) and continues to serve on their board. She was a keynote speaker at the evangelical conference Lausanne 2010, held in Cape Town, South Africa.

Her first husband was killed in Ecuador when she was eight months pregnant and with two small children. She currently lives with her second husband, James Padilla DeBorst, in San José, Costa Rica, and they together lead the Comunidad de Estudios Teológicos Interdisciplinarios.

In Fall 2022, Padilla DeBorst would be joining the faculty of Western Theological Seminary as the Richard C. Oudersluys Associate Professor of World Christianity.

Works

See also 

 Integral mission
 Latin American Theological Fellowship

References

External links 

 7 Inspiring Women: Ruth Padilla DeBorst

Living people
Year of birth missing (living people)
Wheaton College (Illinois) alumni
Boston University School of Theology alumni
Costa Rican evangelicals
Women Christian theologians
World Christianity scholars